The Leycester Creek railway bridge is a heritage-listed railway bridge and viaduct that carries the mostly-closed Murwillumbah railway line across Leycester Creek and Pine and Union Streets in Lismore, in the City of Lismore local government area of New South Wales, Australia. The bridge is owned by RailCorp, an agency of the Government of New South Wales and was added to the New South Wales State Heritage Register on 2 April 1999.

History 

The bridge was built by contractors Crosbie, Marquand and Co. The contract included both the Leycester Creek and Wilson's Creek bridges, the contractors accepting A£20,708 to build the two bridges, later increased to A£22,110. Construction suffered various delays, such as damaged and broken iron cylinders, but was finally completed in October 1892. It was claimed at the bridge's completion that it was the first steel bridge in the country. The railway over the bridge opened in May 1894.

The bridge has been disused since the closure of the Murwillumbah railway line in 2004.

Description 

The bridge consists of a steel three-span truss along with three sets of timber viaducts over the flood plain, with one , one  and one  spans.

Heritage listing 
The Lismore bridges and viaducts are a fine set of bridges all in one location demonstrating the problems of building railways in this flood prone area dating from 1892.

Lismore railway underbridges was listed on the New South Wales State Heritage Register on 2 April 1999 having satisfied the following criteria.

The place possesses uncommon, rare or endangered aspects of the cultural or natural history of New South Wales.

This item is assessed as historically rare. This item is assessed as scientifically rare. This item is assessed as arch. rare. This item is assessed as socially rare.

See also 

Historic bridges of New South Wales
List of railway bridges in New South Wales
 Colemans Bridge over Leycester Creek

Notes

References

Attribution

External links

New South Wales State Heritage Register
Lismore, New South Wales
Railway bridges in New South Wales
Articles incorporating text from the New South Wales State Heritage Register
Bridges completed in 1892
1892 establishments in Australia
Truss bridges in Australia
Viaducts in Australia
Steel bridges in Australia
Wooden bridges in Australia
Murwillumbah railway line